The 2000 Regal Scottish Open was a professional ranking snooker tournament, that was held from March to April 2000 at the AECC, Aberdeen, Scotland. Stephen Hendry, was the defending champion but he lost 2–5 in the last 16 to Matthew Stevens.
 
Ronnie O'Sullivan won the tournament by defeating Mark Williams nine frames to one in the final. O'Sullivan made a 147 maximum break in frame four of his 5–4 victory over Quentin Hann in the last 32.  Stephen Maguire had also made a 147 in the qualifying stages (not televised) so this marked the first time that two maximum breaks had been made in the same ranking tournament.



Main draw

Final

References

Scottish Open (snooker)
2000 in snooker
2000 in Scottish sport
Sports competitions in Aberdeen